Ali Al-Khaibari (born 2 February 1990 in Sakakah) is a Saudi professional footballer who currently plays as a centre back.

Club career
He started his career in Al-Orobah, before joining Al-Nassr in the summer of 2014. He spent three years with Al-Nassr and left without making any appearances. He was sent out on loan on two instances, the first time was to Qatari club Al-Sailiya on February 8, 2015. He was sent out on loan to Najran during the 2015–16 season.

On July 8, 2017, Al-Khaibari left Al-Nassr and joined Al-Ettifaq on a two-year deal. On July 1, 2019, Al-Khaibari signed a three-year contract renewal with Al-Ettifaq. On 7 February 2021, Al-Khaibari was loaned out to fellow Pro League side Al-Ain until the end of the season.

On 21 July 2022, Al-Khaibari joined Al-Qaisumah.

On 16 January 2023, Al-Khaibari was released by Al-Suqoor.

References

Saudi Arabian footballers
Saudi Arabian expatriate footballers
1990 births
Living people
People from Al-Jawf Province
Association football defenders
Al-Orobah FC players
Al Nassr FC players
Al-Sailiya SC players
Najran SC players
Ettifaq FC players
Al-Ain FC (Saudi Arabia) players
Al-Qaisumah FC players
Al-Suqoor FC players
Saudi First Division League players
Saudi Professional League players
Qatar Stars League players
Saudi Second Division players
Expatriate footballers in Qatar
Saudi Arabian expatriate sportspeople in Qatar